The Sky Ball is a mid-sized bouncy ball toy sold by Maui Toys. Each ball measures  in diameter and contains a mix of helium and compressed air.

It has received critical acclaim for its high restitution, or bounciness. The Skyball is often compared to the popular 1965 Wham-O Superball, with the Skyball being advertised as bouncing , "higher than a 1.5 inch superball". In 2010, the ball was packaged with a plastic baseball bat, and advertised as flying as far as  when struck.

See also
 List of inflatable manufactured goods

References

External links
Skyball on Live with Regis and Kelly
Bounce House and Inflatable Water Slide
Review of Skyball in Time to Play magazine

Balls
Inflatable manufactured goods
Articles containing video clips